Mordente is a surname. Notable people with the surname include:

Fabrizio Mordente (1532 – c. 1608), Italian mathematician
Lisa Mordente (born 1958), American actress, singer and dancer
Marco Mordente (born 1979), Italian basketball player
Tony Mordente (born 1935), American dancer, choreographer, actor and television director